Nataliya Kolovanova (born 1 August 1964) is a Soviet-Ukrainian hurdler. She competed in the women's 100 metres hurdles at the 1992 Summer Olympics, representing the Unified Team.

References

External links
 

1964 births
Living people
Athletes (track and field) at the 1992 Summer Olympics
Soviet female hurdlers
Ukrainian female hurdlers
Olympic athletes of the Unified Team
Place of birth missing (living people)